Kakizaki Yoshihiro, later , was the first daimyō of Matsumae Domain in Ezo, (Hokkaidō), Japan.

Biography
Born on the third day of the ninth month of Tenbun 9 (1548), Yoshihiro was the third son of Kakizaki Suehiro. After Toyotomi Hideyoshi defeated the Hōjō at Odawara in 1590, and took measures to check the power of the great clans of the north, Yoshihiro travelled to Kyōto, where in the twelfth month of that year he enjoyed an audience with the kampaku at the Jurakudai palace. Receiving from Hideyoshi also three gorgeous costumes and two hundred ryō of silver, he departed again for the north, reaching the Oshima Peninsula in the third month of 1591. In the eleventh month of the first year of Bunroku (1592), Yoshihiro travelled to Ōsaka, but Hideyoshi was at Hizen Nagoya, in relation to the invasion of Korea; reaching his camp in Kyūshū, as recorded in Shinra no Kiroku, on the second day of the new year Yoshihiro enjoyed another audience with Hideyoshi, where the two discussed Ezo and the invasion. Three days later, Yoshihiro had conferred upon him a  affirming his rights to trade with the Ainu. In 1604 he was granted exclusive trading rights with the Ainu by shōgun Tokugawa Ieyasu. While neither document conferred specific territorial rights or a "fictive rice income", the Matsumae Domain would generally be treated as equivalent to tozama daimyō with an income of ten thousand koku.

Yoshihiro built Matsumae Castle (also known as Fukuyama Castle (Fukuyama-jō 福山城).

See also
 Takeda Nobuhiro

Notes

References

Daimyo
Samurai
Matsumae clan
1548 births
1616 deaths
Deified Japanese people